Thallarcha epigypsa is a moth in the subfamily Arctiinae. It was described by Oswald Bertram Lower in 1902. It is found in Australia, where it has been recorded from South Australia.

References

Moths described in 1902
Lithosiini